Paul Higgins is a Scottish actor, best known for appearing in the British television series The Thick of It, Utopia and Line of Duty.

Early life
Higgins was born in Lanarkshire, Scotland. He was raised as a Roman Catholic, but now he considers himself a lapsed Catholic. As a teenager, he trained to be a priest, but gave his training up aged 17 when he began dating.

Career
Higgins has appeared onstage in Paul and Black Watch, and in the film Complicity. He played Alan in Staying Alive, a hospital drama on ITV. He has also played Jamie McDonald, an aggressive press officer, in the BBC show The Thick of It and its spin-off feature-length film, In the Loop. In 2009, he appeared as Gil Cameron on the BBC drama Hope Springs. He played Michael Dugdale in Channel 4's acclaimed conspiracy thriller Utopia. In 2013 he appeared in series 1 of the BBC series Line of Duty and returned for season 4 in 2017.
He wrote a play titled Nobody Will Ever Forgive Us, which was performed at the Traverse Theatre, Edinburgh in a co-production with the National Theatre of Scotland in November 2008.

Personal life
Higgins is married to actress Amelia Bullmore, whom he met in 1992 while co-starring with her in A View from the Bridge in Manchester. Since December 2019 he has been Chair of ACT, the Actors' Children's Trust, and since September 2021 a Trustee of The Vegan Society.

Filmography

References

External links

Living people
Scottish male television actors
20th-century Scottish male actors
Scottish male stage actors
1964 births